Mauro Caviezel (born 18 August 1988) is a Swiss World Cup alpine ski racer. He competed for
Switzerland in two Winter Olympics and three World Championships; he won a bronze medal in the combined event in 2017 at St. Moritz.

Through December 2020, Caviezel has twelve World Cup podiums; his first was a tie for third in the super-G at the World Cup finals in March 2017. His first win came in a super-G in December 2020. He is the older brother of giant slalom specialist Gino Caviezel (b.1992).

World Cup results

Season standings

Race podiums
 1 win
 12 podiums – (9 SG, 2 DH, 1 AC)

World Championship results

Olympic results

References

External links

Mauro Caviezel World Cup standings at the International Ski Federation

Mauro Caviezel at Atomic

1988 births
Living people
Olympic alpine skiers of Switzerland
Alpine skiers at the 2014 Winter Olympics
Alpine skiers at the 2018 Winter Olympics
Swiss male alpine skiers
Sportspeople from Graubünden